Same-sex marriage has been legal in Yucatán since 4 March 2022. On 25 August 2021, the Congress of Yucatán removed a constitutional ban on same-sex marriages. The new law entered into force on 7 September 2021. Congress had 180 days (i.e. until 6 March 2022) to change statutory law to accommodate same-sex marriage, and did so unanimously on 1 March. The law took effect three days later, and made Yucatán the 25th Mexican state to legalize same-sex marriage.

Legal history

Background

The Mexican Supreme Court ruled on 12 June 2015 that state bans on same-sex marriage are unconstitutional nationwide. The court's ruling is considered a "jurisprudential thesis" and did not invalidate state laws, meaning that same-sex couples denied the right to marry would still have to seek individual amparos in court. The ruling standardized the procedures for judges and courts throughout Mexico to approve all applications for same-sex marriages and made the approval mandatory.

On 26 March 2013, a male couple, Ricardo Arturo Góngora and Javier Alberto Carrillo Esquivel, went to the civil registry office in Mérida to marry. The civil registry rejected their application for a marriage license, arguing that the State Constitution defined marriage as the "union of a man and a woman" and that same-sex couples were therefore unable to legally marry. The couple challenged the decision, and on 1 July the Third District Court recognized that they had the right to marry. The government announced it would not appeal the court ruling, and the couple became the first same-sex couple to marry in Yucatán, on 8 August 2013. Following this first same-sex marriage in the state, six more couples, four male and two female, applied for marriage licenses on 14 August 2013. They filed individual amparos in court, with 3 of them being approved on 4 and 15 November and 17 December 2013 by the courts in the First, Fourth and Third District, respectively. Both of the lesbian couples and one male couple were granted the right to marry. On 6 January 2014, the first lesbian marriage in Yucatán took place in Mérida. The second lesbian couple married on 25 January, and the male couple were married in Mérida on 18 February 2014.

On 17 May 2014, a group of civil society organizations filed suit with the Constitutional Court of Yucatán, claiming that 10 amparos for same-sex marriage rights had been approved in the state in the previous months, but Congress still refused to amend state laws to permit same-sex marriage. The plaintiffs asked that article 49 of the Family Code and Article 94 of the Constitution, which limited marriage to one man and one woman, be "considered in the broadest sense and that the gender of its members be undefined." On 26 February 2015, the court announced that it would decide on 2 March whether the state ban on same-sex marriage was in violation of the Constitution of Mexico and international agreements. Instead, on 2 March the court dismissed the challenge. Activists vowed to appeal the decision. They filed an appeal with the Supreme Court in June 2015. The activists argued that the ban was unconstitutional as the Mexican Constitution prohibits discrimination on the basis of sexual orientation. After postponing a hearing five times, the Mexican Supreme Court dismissed the lawsuit on 31 May 2017.

From January 2017 to March 2017, 15 same-sex couples married in Yucatán using the recurso de amparo remedy, compared to 16 couples who married in all of 2016.

Constitutional restrictions
On 21 July 2009, the Congress of Yucatán overwhelmingly approved a constitutional ban on same-sex marriage in a 24–1 vote. The law, promoted by the right-wing organization Pro Yucatán Network, raised heterosexual marriage and families to the constitutional level. Specifically, Article 94 was amended to read that marriage is "the union of a man and a woman". This was widely seen as an attempt to reject efforts to legalize same-sex marriage in the state, as any attempts to permit same-sex marriage in the future would likewise require a constitutional amendment and a two-thirds majority in Congress. Politicians from the conservative National Action Party (PAN) justified the ban, alleging that "there still aren't adequate conditions within Yucatán society to allow for unions between people of the same sex". The event led to protests outside the local Congress by LGBT organizations.

Yucatán had been one of only three Mexican states to enact a constitutional ban on same-sex marriage; the others being Baja California, and Colima. As of September 2021, all three of these bans have been repealed.

Legalisation efforts

On 24 May 2016, a prominent member of the state Congress said that Yucatán would wait for the federal Congress of the Union to legislate on same-sex marriage before taking the necessary steps to amend local laws.

On 15 August 2018, Governor Rolando Zapata Bello introduced bills to amend the state Constitution and Family Code to legalize same-sex marriage. On 10 April 2019, Congress rejected the bill in a 9–15 vote. In response to the failure to pass the legislation, the 17th Pride Parade in Mérida saw the unprecedented participation of around 8,000 people. A second attempt at legalizing same-sex marriage failed on 15 July 2019, again with 15 votes against and 9 votes in favor. In both cases, Congress voted against same-sex marriage in a secret vote, without the public being able to have knowledge of the votes cast by their representatives. This was controversial, and several activists from the Collective for the Protection of All Families of Yucatán (Colectivo de Protección de Todas las Familias de Yucatán) and other advocacy groups filed a legal challenge with the Supreme Court of Justice of the Nation arguing that this was unconstitutional. On 18 August 2021, the Supreme Court ordered an "open and transparent" re-vote in Congress. Two months earlier, a federal court in Sinaloa had ordered that state's Congress to legalize same-sex marriage, with any legislators voting against to be found in contempt of court and unable to run for or hold office for seven years. Fearful that lawmakers in Yucatán could face similar charges, the state Congress was widely expected to approve a same-sex marriage bill in the coming days. 

Legislation to remove the constitutional ban on same-sex marriage was sponsored by deputies Milagros Romero Bastarrachea and Silvia López Scoffie. It was approved unanimously by a Congress committee, and a plenary vote was scheduled for Wednesday, 25 August 2021. Congress passed the bill on a 20–5 vote on 25 August, reaching the two-thirds majority needed to amend the Constitution. Deputy Karla Franco Blanco said that the passage of the bill "is in line with the fundamental principle that every individual has the right to enjoy freedoms, equal rights and protection from discrimination, as provided by the Political Constitution of [Mexico]." The law was published in the state's official gazette on 6 September 2021, and took effect the following day. Governor Mauricio Vila Dosal praised the vote.

Article 94 of the Constitution of Yucatán was amended as follows:
 in Spanish. 
 (Marriage is an institution establishing the legal union of two persons, with equal rights, duties and obligations, with the possibility of generating human reproduction in a free, responsible and informed manner.)

Provisions relating to concubinage were also amended:
 in Spanish: 
 (Concubinage is the union of two people who, free from marriage, live as spouses and create a family, under the terms established by law.)

Although Congress modified the Constitution to recognize same-sex marriages, it did not amend the state's Family Code. Milagros Romero Bastarrachea, deputy for Citizens' Movement and one of the proponents of the bill, said in an interview with the media that the state would amend all secondary laws within 180 days of the bill's publication (i.e. by 6 March 2022). A bill to reform the secondary laws to legalize same-sex marriage was introduced to Congress on 15 December 2021 by Deputy Vila Goméz Herrera. It was approved unanimously by a Congress committee on 26 February, and in a 25–0 vote by the full Congress on 1 March 2022. The law was published in the official gazette on 3 March, and took effect the following day. The first same-sex couple to marry in Yucatán following legalization were Irving Suárez and Luciano Martínez, a couple for 18 years, on 4 March in Mérida.

The latter two meaning "marriage for all".

Public opinion
According to a 2018 survey by the National Institute of Statistics and Geography, 43% of the Yucatán public opposed same-sex marriage.

See also

 Same-sex marriage in Mexico
 LGBT rights in Mexico

Notes

References

External links
Text of Yucatán's same-sex marriage law (in Spanish)

Yucatán
Yucatán
2022 in LGBT history